Manzoor Sakhiran (Sindhi: منظور سخيراڻي) (Urdu:منظور سخیرانی), additionally known as Ustad Manzoor Sakhirani, is a particularly famous and popular Sindhi singer from the Dadu Sindh region. A professional singer since 1980.

He specialises within various songs, including folk songs and patriotic regional songs; he generally performs at literary gatherings. He released his first album, named Band Darwazo Ta, in 1980, continuing onward to publish greater than 30 albums within his career. His work additionally remains supplemented via a second singer, Singer Shaman Mirali, who attained prominence in 1990; his music remains notable for displaying his Sindhi identity prominently.

Personal life
Manzoor Sakhirani born to Bahar ud Din on 14 April 1959 at Dadu city. His father was employed in Revenue Department. His father had desire for Manzoor Sakhirani that he may become Engineer after getting higher education. But he had keen interest in singing since childhood. He got his education till intermediate from Dadu and later got admission in a University for Engineering but he given up incomplete and turned himself to singing. Manzoor Sakhirani got classical music training from Ustad Qudrat Ullah.

Reference

1961 births
Sindhi people
Pakistani male singers
Living people
Sindhi-language singers
Musicians from Sindh
Singers from Sindh